The 1959–60 Boston Celtics season was the 14th season for the franchise in the National Basketball Association (NBA). The Celtics finished the season by winning their third NBA Championship.

Regular season

Season standings

Record vs. opponents

Game log

Playoffs

|- align="center" bgcolor="#ccffcc"
| 1
| March 16
| Philadelphia
| W 111–105
| Bill Sharman (25)
| Bill Russell (30)
| Bob Cousy (13)
| Boston Garden
| 1–0
|- align="center" bgcolor="#ffcccc"
| 2
| March 18
| @ Philadelphia
| L 110–115
| Tom Heinsohn (26)
| Bill Russell (20)
| Bob Cousy (6)
| Philadelphia Civic Center
| 1–1
|- align="center" bgcolor="#ccffcc"
| 3
| March 19
| Philadelphia
| W 120–90
| Bill Russell (26)
| Bill Russell (39)
| Bob Cousy (8)
| Boston Garden
| 2–1
|- align="center" bgcolor="#ccffcc"
| 4
| March 20
| @ Philadelphia
| W 112–104
| Tom Heinsohn (28)
| Bill Russell (21)
| Bob Cousy (8)
| Philadelphia Civic Center
| 3–1
|- align="center" bgcolor="#ffcccc"
| 5
| March 22
| Philadelphia
| L 107–128
| Bill Russell (22)
| Bill Russell (27)
| Bob Cousy (7)
| Boston Garden
| 3–2
|- align="center" bgcolor="#ccffcc"
| 6
| March 24
| @ Philadelphia
| W 119–117
| Bill Russell (25)
| Bill Russell (25)
| Bob Cousy (4)
| Philadelphia Civic Center
| 4–2
|-

|- align="center" bgcolor="#ccffcc"
| 1
| March 27
| St. Louis
| W 140–122
| Tom Heinsohn (24)
| Bill Russell (19)
| Bob Cousy (12)
| Boston Garden10,002
| 1–0
|- align="center" bgcolor="#ffcccc"
| 2
| March 29
| St. Louis
| L 103–113
| Bill Sharman (30)
| Bill Russell (40)
| Bob Cousy (8)
| Boston Garden13,909
| 1–1
|- align="center" bgcolor="#ccffcc"
| 3
| April 2
| @ St. Louis
| W 102–86
| Tom Heinsohn (30)
| Bill Russell (16)
| Bob Cousy (13)
| Kiel Auditorium10,612
| 2–1
|- align="center" bgcolor="#ffcccc"
| 4
| April 3
| @ St. Louis
| L 96–106
| Ramsey, Sharman (20)
| Bill Russell (19)
| Bob Cousy (4)
| Kiel Auditorium10,612
| 2–2
|- align="center" bgcolor="#ccffcc"
| 5
| April 5
| St. Louis
| W 127–102
| Tom Heinsohn (34)
| Bill Russell (26)
| Bob Cousy (10)
| Boston Garden13,909
| 3–2
|- align="center" bgcolor="#ffcccc"
| 6
| April 7
| @ St. Louis
| L 102–105
| Bill Russell (17)
| Bill Russell (16)
| Bob Cousy (9)
| Kiel Auditorium10,612
| 3–3
|- align="center" bgcolor="#ccffcc"
| 7
| April 9
| St. Louis
| W 122–103
| Frank Ramsey (24)
| Bill Russell (35)
| Bob Cousy (14)
| Boston Garden13,909
| 4–3
|-

Roster

Awards and honors
 Bob Cousy, All-NBA First Team
 Bill Russell, All-NBA Second Team
 Bill Sharman, All-NBA Second Team

References

 Celtics on Database Basketball
 /1960.html  Celtics on Basketball Reference

Boston Celtics seasons
NBA championship seasons
Boston Celtics
Boston Celtics
Boston Celtics
1950s in Boston
1960s in Boston